This is a list of Mistresses of Girton College, Cambridge.

 1869 Charlotte Manning
 1870 Emily Anne Eliza Shirreff
 1870–1872 Annie Austin
 1872–1875 Emily Davies
 1875–1884 Marianne Bernard
 1885–1903 Elizabeth Welsh
 1903–1916 Emily Elizabeth Constance Jones
 1916–1922 Katharine Jex-Blake
 1922–1925 Bertha Surtees Phillpotts
 1925–1931 Edith Helen Major
 1931–1942 Helen Marion Wodehouse
 1942–1949 Kathleen Teresa Blake Butler
 1949–1968 Mary Cartwright
 1968–1976 Muriel Clara Bradbrook
 1976–1983 Brenda Ryman
 1984–1991 Mary Warnock
 1992–1998 Juliet Campbell
 1998–2009 Marilyn Strathern
 2009–2022 Susan J. Smith
 2022 to date Elisabeth Kendall

References
 Past Mistresses on the Girton College website

 
Girton